Benjamin Dambielle (born 15 July 1985) is a French former professional rugby union player. His position was fullback. He previously played for La Rochelle, Brive and Biarritz.

References

1985 births
Living people
French rugby union players
People from Auch
Biarritz Olympique players
CA Brive players
Racing 92 players
Rugby union fullbacks
Sportspeople from Gers